Congregation Magen David Synagogue is a historic Sephardic Syrian-Jewish synagogue located in the Bensonhurst neighborhood of Brooklyn, New York.  Erected in 1920–1921, the synagogue was at its height of popularity during the 1940s, 1950s, and early 1960s. The synagogue is still in continual use for daily and Shabbat prayers.  It is a two-story, Romanesque Revival style brick building on a raised basement.  It features a variety of brick designs and stone details, round arched windows, and a red terra cotta clad tile roof.

In 2001, the building was declared a landmark by the New York City Landmarks Preservation Commission. By 2004, the building was certified and listed with the National Register of Historic Places.

See also 
List of New York City Landmarks
National Register of Historic Places listings in Kings County, New York

References

Synagogues in Brooklyn
Bensonhurst, Brooklyn
New York City Designated Landmarks in Brooklyn
Sephardi synagogues
Sephardi Jewish culture in New York City
Syrian-American culture in New York City
Syrian-Jewish culture in New York (state)

Properties of religious function on the National Register of Historic Places in Brooklyn
Synagogues on the National Register of Historic Places in New York City
1921 establishments in New York City
Synagogues completed in 1921
Romanesque Revival architecture in New York City